Mackeyville is an unincorporated community in Clinton County, Pennsylvania, United States. Mackeyville has a post office with ZIP code 17750. Mackeyville is located near the eastern terminus of Nittany Valley. Fishing Creek runs along the eastern edge of town center head south to north. Fishing creek is a free limestone stream and parts of it are designated trophy trout stream.

History 
Mackyville was a small transportation hub in the 1800s. Old narrow gage rail beds and parts of the canal system can still be seen in a few locations.

Recreation 
Just east of Mackeyville is Belle Springs Golf Course and the Clinton County Fairgrounds. The entrance for the golf course and Fairgrounds are both located on Fairgrounds road. Belles Springs also has a small playground located on Belle Springs Road along Fishing Creek.

References

Unincorporated communities in Clinton County, Pennsylvania
Unincorporated communities in Pennsylvania